

Duchess of Teschen

House of Piast, 1290–1653

House of Habsburg, 1653–1722

House of Lorraine, 1722–1765

House of Habsburg-Lorraine, 1765–1918

See also 
 List of Polish consorts
 List of Austrian consorts
 Holy Roman Empress
 List of Hungarian consorts
 List of Bohemian consorts
 List of Lotharingian consorts
 List of Tuscan consorts

Notes

References

Sources 
 
 
 

 
Teschen